Yevhen Shevchenko (born 16 October 1987 in Dniprodzerzhynsk) is a Ukrainian football striker. He weighs .

Club history
He played for FC Kremin Kremenchuk in the Ukrainian Second League during 2007.

External links

Official team website for FC Kremin Kremenchuk

1987 births
Living people
Ukrainian footballers
FC Kremin Kremenchuk players
Association football forwards
People from Kamianske
Sportspeople from Dnipropetrovsk Oblast